Autoditacker is the third studio album by German electronica duo Mouse on Mars. It was released in 1997.

Critical reception

Marc Weingarten of Entertainment Weekly described Autoditacker as "a messy mosaic of trills, chirps, and buzzing sounds that slam headfirst into dense, abstract, and occasionally danceable grooves." Stephen Thomas Erlewine of AllMusic said, "Each listen reveals new layers of the group's intricate arrangements, and the shifting instrumentation and themes recall the best adventurous jazz in terms of unpredictability."

In 2017, Pitchfork placed Autoditacker at number 18 on its list of "The 50 Best IDM Albums of All Time".

Track listing

Personnel
Credits adapted from liner notes.

Mouse on Mars
 Jan St. Werner – composition, production
 Andi Toma – composition, production

Additional personnel
 F.X.Randomiz – digital sound processing (2)
 John Frenett – bass guitar (4)
 Lætitia Sadier – lyrics (10)

References

External links
 
 

1997 albums
Mouse on Mars albums
Too Pure albums
Rough Trade Records albums
Thrill Jockey albums